Ponthus is a surname. Notable people with the surname include: 

Joseph Ponthus (1978–2021), French writer
Marc Ponthus, French pianist
Sandra Ponthus (born 1976), French diver

given name
Ponthus Westerholm (born 1992), Swedish ice hockey player